The 1957 World Fencing Championships were held in Paris, France.

Medal table

Medal summary

Men's events

Women's events

References

FIE Results

World Fencing Championships
1957 in French sport
1957 in Paris
Fencing
International fencing competitions hosted by France
1957 in fencing